Henry Short (31 March 1874 – 11 May 1916) was an Australian cricketer. He played in one first-class match for South Australia in 1904/05.

See also
 List of South Australian representative cricketers

References

External links
 

1874 births
1916 deaths
Australian cricketers
South Australia cricketers
Cricketers from Adelaide